General Lester L. Lyles (born April 20, 1946) is a retired four-star general in the United States Air Force (USAF). He served as Vice Chief of Staff of the United States Air Force, and Commander, Air Force Materiel Command, Wright-Patterson Air Force Base, Ohio. After retirement from the USAF in 2003, he became a company director for General Dynamics, DPL Inc., KBR, Inc., Precision Castparts Corp., MTC Technologies, Battelle Memorial Institute and USAA. Lyles is also a trustee of Analytic Services and a managing partner of Four Seasons Ventures, LLC.

Biography
Lyles entered the USAF in 1968 as a distinguished graduate of the Air Force ROTC program. He served in various assignments, including Program Element Monitor of the Short-Range Attack Missile at USAF Headquarters in 1974, and as special assistant and aide-de-camp to the commander of Air Force Systems Command (AFSC) in 1978. In 1981 he was assigned to Wright-Patterson AFB as avionics division chief in the F-16 Systems Program Office. He has served as director of tactical aircraft systems at AFSC headquarters and as director of the Medium-Launch Vehicles Program and Space-Launch Systems offices.

Lyles became AFSC headquarters' assistant deputy chief of staff for requirements in 1989, and deputy chief of staff for requirements in 1990. In 1992 he became vice commander of Ogden Air Logistics Center, Hill AFB, Utah. He served as Commander of the center from 1993 until 1994, then was assigned to command the Space and Missile Systems Center at Los Angeles AFB, Calif., until 1996. Lyles became the director of the Ballistic Missile Defense Organization in 1996. In May 1999, he was assigned as vice chief of staff at Headquarters U.S. Air Force. He assumed command of Air Force Materiel Command in April 2000. Lyles retired from the air force on October 1, 2003.

Lyles was a member of The President's Commission on U.S. Space Policy. He chairs the "Rationale and Goals of the U.S. Civil Space Program" committee of the United States National Academies. In May 2009 he was named a member Review of United States Human Space Flight Plans Committee, an independent review requested by the Office of Science and Technology Policy. The same year he was appointed to the Defense Science Board, a committee of civilian experts appointed to advise the U.S. Department of Defense on scientific and technical matters. As of December 2013, he continues to serve as its vice chairman. In December 2009, General Lyles was appointed to the President's Intelligence Advisory Board by the White House.

On January 22, 2013, General Lyles was named chairman of the board of directors for USAA having been a USAA member since 1968 and a member of the board of directors since 2004. General Lyles completed his final term as chairman in August 2019 after nearly seven years in the role and left USAA's board of directors after 15 years of dedicated service.

On May 15, 2019, General Lyles assumed the role of non-executive chairman of the board for KBR, Inc. having been a member of the board of directors since November 2007.

Education
1968 Bachelor of Science degree in mechanical engineering, Howard University, Washington, D.C.
1969 Master of Science degree in mechanical and nuclear engineering, Air Force Institute of Technology Program, New Mexico State University, Las Cruces
1980 Defense Systems Management College, Fort Belvoir, Virginia
1981 Armed Forces Staff College, Norfolk, Virginia
1985 National War College, Fort Lesley J. McNair, Washington, D.C.
1991 National and International Security Management Course, Harvard University, Cambridge, Massachusetts

Assignments
February 1969 - November 1971, propulsion and structures engineer, Standard Space-Launch Vehicles Program Office, Los Angeles Air Force Station, California
November 1971 - July 1974, propulsion engineer, Headquarters Aeronautical Systems Division, Wright-Patterson AFB, Ohio
July 1974 - April 1975, program element monitor for the short-range attack missile, Headquarters U.S. Air Force, Washington, D.C.
April 1975 - March 1978, executive officer to the deputy chief of staff for research and development, Headquarters U.S. Air Force, Washington, D.C.
March 1978 - January 1980, special assistant and aide-de-camp to the commander, Headquarters AFSC, Andrews AFB, Maryland
January 1980 - June 1980, Defense Systems Management College, Fort Belvoir, Virginia
June 1980 - January 1981, Armed Forces Staff College, Norfolk, Virginia
January 1981 - June 1981, chief, Avionics Division, F-16 Systems Program Office, Headquarters Aeronautical Systems Division, Wright-Patterson AFB, Ohio
June 1981 - July 1984, deputy director for special and advanced projects, F-16 Systems Program Office, Headquarters Aeronautical Systems Division, Wright-Patterson AFB, Ohio
August 1984 - June 1985, student, National War College, Fort Lesley J. McNair, Washington, D.C.
June 1985 - June 1987, director of tactical aircraft systems, Headquarters AFSC, Andrews AFB, Maryland
June 1987 - April 1988, director, Medium-Launch Vehicles Program Office, Headquarters Space Systems Division, Los Angeles AFS, California
April 1988 - August 1989, assistant deputy commander for launch systems, Headquarters Space Systems Division, Los Angeles AFS, California
August 1989 - July 1992, assistant deputy chief of staff for requirements, then deputy chief of staff for requirements, Headquarters AFSC, Andrews AFB, Maryland
July 1992 - November 1994, vice commander, then commander, Ogden Air Logistics Center, Hill AFB, Utah
November 1994 - August 1996, commander, Space and Missile Systems Center, Los Angeles AFB, California
August 1996 - May 1999, director, Ballistic Missile Defense Organization, Department of Defense, Washington, D.C.
May 1999 - April 2000, Vice Chief of Staff of the United States Air Force, Headquarters U.S. Air Force, Washington, D.C.
April 2000 - October 2003, commander, United States Air Force Materiel Command, Wright-Patterson AFB, Ohio

Awards and decorations

Other achievements
1990 Astronautics Engineer of the Year, National Space Club
1994 Roy Wilkins Renown Service Award for outstanding contributions to military equal opportunity policies and programs, National Association for the Advancement of Colored People
1999 Sociedad de Ingenieros Award, New Mexico State University
1999 Hiram Hadley Founder's Award of Excellence, New Mexico State University
2000 Gen. Bernard A. Schriever Award
2003 Honorary Doctor of Laws from New Mexico State University
2012 Thomas D. White Award from the United States Air Force Academy

Effective dates of promotion
Second Lieutenant February 2, 1968
First Lieutenant August 2, 1969
Captain February 2, 1971
Major November 1, 1979
Lieutenant Colonel Dec 1, 1982
Colonel December 1, 1985
Brigadier General May 1, 1991
Major General August 6, 1993
Lieutenant General November 16, 1994
General July 1, 1999

References
Review of U.S. Human Space Flight Plans Committee website

Notes

United States Air Force generals
1946 births
Living people
Air Force Institute of Technology alumni
Recipients of the Legion of Merit
Howard University alumni
African-American United States Air Force personnel
Recipients of the Order of the Sword (United States)
Recipients of the Defense Superior Service Medal
Vice Chiefs of Staff of the United States Air Force
Members of the United States National Academy of Engineering
Recipients of the Defense Distinguished Service Medal
Recipients of the Air Force Distinguished Service Medal
21st-century African-American people
20th-century African-American people